Orchomenus or Orchomenos was a town of Phthiotis in ancient Thessaly. In 302 BCE, Cassander planned to transfer to town's population to Phthiotic Thebes but this was prevented by Demetrius Poliorcetes.

Its site is unlocated.

References

Populated places in ancient Thessaly
Former populated places in Greece
Achaea Phthiotis
Lost ancient cities and towns